Penjwen District is a district of the Sulaymaniyah Governorate in Kurdistan Region, Iraq. During the Iran-Iraq war much of the area was destroyed by aerial bombardments displacing thousands of people in the district.
The name 'Penjwen' originates from the Kurdish words 'Penj' and 'Jwen' from the 5 Kurdish-Jewish settlements that originated in the region. 
Penjwen is now known for its lush forests, mountains and springs for tourism.

References

See also
Kurdistan

Iraqi Kurdistan

Kurdistan Region

Districts of Sulaymaniyah Province